Swapan Kar is an Indian politician. In 2011 he was elected as MLA of Lumding Vidhan Sabha Constituency in Assam Legislative Assembly.

References

Year of birth missing (living people)
All India United Democratic Front politicians
Living people